A by-election was held for the New South Wales Legislative Assembly electorate of West Maitland on 4 August 1874 because Benjamin Lee resigned.

Dates

Result

Benjamin Lee resigned.

See also
Electoral results for the district of West Maitland
List of New South Wales state by-elections

References

1874 elections in Australia
New South Wales state by-elections
1870s in New South Wales